Manchester Reform Synagogue, a member of the Movement for Reform Judaism, is one of the oldest Reform Jewish communities in the United Kingdom. Founded in 1857 with congregation president Horatio Michollis and Rabbi Solomon Marcus Schiller-Szinessy under the name Manchester Congregation of British Jews by a group consisting mainly of German-Jewish immigrants, the synagogue is located in central Manchester at Jackson's Row. The congregation bought that site in 1949. 

The current building was financed by money from the War Damage Commission, after the previous synagogue building on Park Place was destroyed on 1 June 1941 in the Manchester Blitz during the Second World War. Albert Isaacs, Alexander Levy, and Frederick Lister laid the cornerstone on 18 May 1952. After completion the synagogue was inaugurated on 28 November 1953. The building was designed by Peter Cummings and Eric Levy. John Bradshaw designed the stained glass windows, which were manufactured by the stained glass company Charles Lightfoot. The building contains a large synagogue, banqueting hall and classrooms.

The building is to be demolished to make way for the St Michael's redevelopment project. Plans were announced in 2014, and in 2021 the sale of the synagogue was agreed. The building is to close in late 2022.

The synagogue building at Jackson's Row was used as a filming location for the 2021 BBC TV series  Ridley Road.

See also
 List of former synagogues in the United Kingdom
 List of Jewish communities in the United Kingdom
 Movement for Reform Judaism

References

External links 
 
 Manchester Reform Synagogue on Jewish Communities and Records – UK (hosted by JewishGen)

Synagogues completed in 1953
1857 establishments in England
German-Jewish culture in the United Kingdom
Reform synagogues in the United Kingdom
Religious organizations established in 1857
Synagogues in Manchester